Everything I Have Is Yours is a 1991 compilation album of songs by Billy Eckstine, subtitled "The Best of the M-G-M Years". It was released by Verve Records as a double LP.

Reception

The editors of AllMusic awarded the album a full five stars, and Scott Yanow wrote: "Although not as essential from the jazz standpoint as Billy Eckstine's earlier big-band dates, this two-fer features the singer at the peak of his powers."

Max Morath, author of The NPR Curious Listener's Guide to Popular Standards, listed the album as among "Billy's Best," calling it "fine."

Track listing

References

Billy Eckstine albums
Verve Records compilation albums
1994 compilation albums